The Esoterics is a vocal ensemble based in Seattle, Washington that performs contemporary a cappella choral settings of poetry, philosophy, and spiritual writings from around the world.

It was founded in 1992 by director Eric Banks for his Master's and Doctoral recitals in Choral Studies at the University of Washington. He chose a name based on εσοτερικος, the ancient Greek adjective that describes a close-knit community and secret knowledge. The Esoterics incorporated with this name in early 1993.

The Esoterics has presented 21 seasons of virtuosic choral compositions composed in many languages and based on world religions. The Esoterics has performed over 400 concerts throughout the Pacific Northwest, has commissioned and premiered more than 100 new works for a cappella voices in dozens of languages, and has mastered many of the most virtuosic choral compositions of the last century. " As the only chorus from North America, it has been invited to compete in the 2000 Cork International Choral Festival, the 2001 Certamen Coral de Tolosa in Spain, and the 2006 Harald Andersén International Choir Competition in Helsinki, Finland. In 2005, The Esoterics announced the inauguration of its annual choral composition competition, Polyphonos, which awards three premiere commissions each year to a national composer, an international composer, and a young composer under 30 years of age. In 2011, The Esoterics appeared at the National Convention of The American Choral Director's Association in Chicago as the only community ensemble appearing from the West Coast.

In recognition for its efforts in choral education and innovation, The Esoterics has been honored four times with the ASCAP/Chorus America Award for the Adventurous Programming of Contemporary Music (in 2001, 2003, 2006, and 2008). The Esoterics has received several grants from the arts commissions of Washington State, King County, and the City of Seattle, as well as from The Ann Stookey Fund for New Music, ArtsFund, The Seattle Foundation, and The National Endowment for the Arts. The Esoterics is a member of the American Choral Director's Association, Chorus America, the International Federation for Choral Music, and GALA, the Gay and Lesbian Association of Choruses.

Discography
Beata. Seattle, WA:Terpsichore (1997).
Antiphonia. Seattle, WA:Terpsichore (1999).
Elementia. Seattle, WA:Terpsichore (2001).
Penitentia. Seattle, WA:Terpsichore (2004).
Immaginosa. Seattle, WA:Terpsichore (2005).
Sonettaria. Seattle, WA:Terpsichore (2006).
Nottura. Seattle, WA:Terpsichore (2006).
Mandala. Seattle, WA:Terpsichore (2008).
Ru'ia. Seattle, WA:Terpsichore (2009).
Ourania. Seattle, WA:Terpsichore (2009).
Barber. Seattle, WA: Terpsichore (2010).
Haptadama. Seattle, WA: Terpsichore (2011)
Chiaroscura. Seattle, WA: Terpsichore (2011)

References

External links
Official site
Ponnekanti, Rosemary. Seattle choir brings harmony to religion, The News Tribune (2007-05-04)

Choirs in Washington (state)
A cappella musical groups
Musical groups established in 1992